The Doyle Cup is an ice hockey trophy won through a best-of-7 series conducted annually by the Canadian Junior Hockey League to determine the Pacific region berth in the Centennial Cup, the national Junior A championship.  From 1971 to 2021, the series was played between the Fred Page Cup champions of the British Columbia Hockey League (BCHL) and the Enerflex Cup champions of the Alberta Junior Hockey League (AJHL), except from 2013 to 2017 when it was replaced by the Western Canada Cup. Its future status is uncertain because of the BCHL's withdrawal from the CJHL after the 2020–21 season.  The current trophy was donated in 1984 by Pete Doyle, a Penticton, British Columbia businessman, replacing the Pacific Centennial Cup that two leagues competed for from 1971 to 1984.

The Pacific region's Doyle Cup Champion traditionally played the Western region's ANAVET Cup champion for the Abbott Cup, the Western Canadian Championship.  However, the Abbott Cup diminished in importance following the reorganization of the national championship in 1990.  The Abbott Cup was then presented to the winner of the round-robin game, between the Pacific champion and Western champion, during the larger Royal Cup competition; this practice ended, and the Abbott Cup was retired, after the 1999 season.

Champions
The BCHL was known as the BCJHL until 1990
Also in 1976, 1977, and 1979 a PCJHL champion defeated the BCJHL champion at the Mowatt Cup to advance to this round.
Bolded are the champions.
{| cellpadding="0"
|- align="left" style="vertical-align: top"
|
|
{| cellpadding="1" style="font-size: 90%; border: 1px solid gray;"
|- align="center" style="font-size: larger;"
| colspan=5 | Pacific Junior "A" Champions
|- style="background:lightblue;"
! style= | Year
! style= width="185" | AJHL Champion
! style= width="185" | BCHL Champion
! style= | Series
|- align="center" style="vertical-align: middle;" style="background:lightblue;"
|- align="center" bgcolor="#eeeeee"
|colspan="4"|Pacific Centennial Cup Championship
|- bgcolor=
|1971	||Red Deer Rustlers	||Penticton Broncos		||4-3
|- bgcolor=
|1972	||Red Deer Rustlers	||Vernon Essos		||4-2
|- bgcolor=
|1973	||Calgary Canucks		||Penticton Broncos	||1-4
|- bgcolor=
|1974	||Red Deer Rustlers		||Kelowna Buckaroos	||1-4
|- bgcolor=
|1975	||Spruce Grove Mets	||Bellingham Blazers	||4-2
|- bgcolor=
|1976	||Spruce Grove Mets	||Nor'Wes Caps (PCJHL)	||4-1
|- bgcolor=
|1977	||Calgary Canucks	||Richmond Sockeyes (PCJHL) ||4-1
|- bgcolor=
|1978	||Calgary Canucks		||Merritt Centennials	||2-4
|- bgcolor=
|1979	||Fort Saskatchewan Traders||Richmond Sockeyes (PCJHL)	||4-1
|- bgcolor=
|1980	||Red Deer Rustlers	||Penticton Knights		||4-0
|- bgcolor=
|1981	||St. Albert Saints	||Penticton Knights		||4-1
|- bgcolor=
|1982	||St. Albert Saints	||Penticton Knights		||4-3
|- bgcolor=
|1983	||Calgary Canucks		||Abbotsford Flyers	||0-4
|- bgcolor=
|1984	||Fort Saskatchewan Traders	||Langley Eagles	||2-4
|-  align="center" bgcolor="#eeeeee"
|colspan="4"|Doyle Cup
|- bgcolor=
|1985	||Red Deer Rustlers		||Penticton Knights	||1-4
|- bgcolor=
|1986	||Calgary Canucks		||Penticton Knights	||1-4
|- bgcolor=
|1987	||Red Deer Rustlers		||Richmond Sockeyes	||3-4
|- bgcolor=
|1988	||Calgary Canucks	||Vernon Lakers		||4-0
|- bgcolor=
|1989	||Red Deer Rustlers		||Vernon Lakers		||2-4
|- bgcolor=
|1990	||Calgary Canucks		||New Westminster Royals||0-4
|- bgcolor=
|1991	||Calgary Royals		||Vernon Lakers	||1-4
|- bgcolor=
|1992	||Olds Grizzlys		||Vernon Lakers	||3-4
|- bgcolor=
|1993	||Olds Grizzlys		||Kelowna Spartans	||1-4
|- bgcolor=
|1994	||Olds Grizzlys	||Kelowna Spartans		||4-2
|- bgcolor=
|1995	||Calgary Canucks	||Chilliwack Chiefs		||4-3
|- bgcolor=
|1996	||St. Albert Saints		||Vernon Vipers	||3-4
|- bgcolor=
|1997	||Fort McMurray Oil Barons	||South Surrey Eagles	||1-4
|- bgcolor=
|1998	||St. Albert Saints		||South Surrey Eagles	||2-4
|- bgcolor=
|1999	||Calgary Canucks		||Vernon Vipers	||1-4
|- bgcolor=
|2000	||Fort McMurray Oil Barons||Chilliwack Chiefs	||4-1
|- bgcolor=
|2001	||Camrose Kodiaks	||Victoria Salsa		||4-2
|- bgcolor=
|2002	||Drayton Valley Thunder	||Chilliwack Chiefs	||2-4
|- bgcolor=
|2003	||Camrose Kodiaks	||Vernon Vipers		||4-2
|- bgcolor=
|2004	||Grande Prairie Storm	||Nanaimo Clippers	||1-4
|- bgcolor=
|2005	||Camrose Kodiaks	||Surrey Eagles		||4-1
|- bgcolor=
|2006	||Fort McMurray Oil Barons	||Burnaby Express	||2-4
|- bgcolor=
|2007	||Camrose Kodiaks	||Nanaimo Clippers		||4-1
|- bgcolor=
|2008	||Camrose Kodiaks	||Penticton Vees		||4-1
|- bgcolor=
|2009	||Grande Prairie Storm	||Vernon Vipers	||0-4
|- bgcolor=
|2010   ||Spruce Grove Saints       ||Vernon Vipers       ||3-4
|- bgcolor=
|2011   ||Spruce Grove Saints      ||Vernon Vipers        ||3-4
|-
|2012   ||Brooks Bandits           ||Penticton Vees       ||1-4
|- align="center" bgcolor="#eeeeee"
| colspan="4" | 2013-2017: replaced by Western Canada Cup
|- bgcolor=
|2018   ||Spruce Grove Saints      ||Wenatchee Wild       ||1-4
|-
|2019 ||Brooks Bandits || Prince George Spruce Kings || 2-4
|- align="center" bgcolor="#eeeeee"
|colspan=4 align=center rowspan=2 | 2020-2022: not awarded due
|}
|}
Notes

 Results by team results as of 2012 Doyle Cup Results by league results as of 2012 Doyle CupAlberta/British Columbia Junior "A" Championship (1962-70)Prior to the 1970-71 season, the winner of this series was a part of the Memorial Cup playoffs.1970 Not Contested*1969 Lethbridge Sugar Kings (AJHL)
1968 Penticton Broncos (BCJHL)
1967 New Westminster Royals (PCJHL)
1966 Edmonton Oil Kings (AJHL)
1965 Edmonton Oil Kings (AJHL)
1964 Edmonton Oil Kings (AJHL)
1963 Edmonton Oil Kings (AJHL)
1962 Edmonton Oil Kings (AJHL)(*) The AJHL Champion did not challenge the BCJHL Champion for the right to appear in the Abbott Cup.''

References

External links
Official Doyle Cup Website
AJHL Website
BCHL Website
CJHL Website

Ice hockey in Western Canada
Ice hockey tournaments in Canada
Alberta Junior Hockey League
British Columbia Hockey League
Canadian Junior Hockey League trophies and awards